Nathaniel Robert Hinton (born June 8, 1999) is an American professional basketball player for the Cleveland Charge of the NBA G League. He played college basketball for the Houston Cougars.

High school career
Hinton started playing basketball as a freshman for Forestview High School in Gastonia, North Carolina, before transferring to Gaston Day School in the same city. For his sophomore season, he moved to Northside Christian Academy in Charlotte, North Carolina, averaging 18 points, six rebounds and four steals per game, and led his team to the North Carolina Independent Schools Athletic Association (NCISAA) 2A title game. Hinton returned to Gaston Day for his final two years of high school. As a junior, he averaged a team-high 19.1 points per game, helping his team reach the NCISAA 2A semi-finals. 

After his junior season, Hinton led Team Loaded NC to the Adidas Gauntlet final, drawing the attention of several high-major NCAA Division I programs. As a senior, he averaged 19.9 points, 7.5 rebounds, 7.7 assists and four steals per game, helping Gaston Day to a NCISAA 2A runner-up finish. Hinton was an NCISAA 2A All-State selection and was named Gaston Gazette Player of the Year. He scored 2,217 points in his high school career.

Recruiting
Hinton was a consensus four-star recruit and committed to play college basketball for Houston. He became the top recruit to join the program under head coach Kelvin Sampson.

College career
Hinton was the preseason Freshman of the Year in the American Athletic Conference (AAC). On January 6, 2019, he was named AAC Freshman of the Week after recording a season-high 19 points and nine rebounds in a 90–77 win over Memphis. On March 10, Hinton posted his first double-double of 16 points and 11 rebounds in an 85–69 victory over Cincinnati, helping Houston clinch the AAC regular season title. As a freshman, he averaged 7.2 points, 4.4 rebounds and 1.1 assists per game and was selected to the AAC All-Freshman Team. 

On December 11, 2019, Hinton recorded a sophomore season-high 25 points and 10 rebounds in a 71–63 win over UT Arlington. He tallied career-highs and set Fertitta Center records of 16 rebounds and five steals, to go with 20 points, in a 78–63 victory over UCF on January 3, 2020. As a sophomore, Hinton averaged 10.6 points, 8.7 rebounds, two assists and 1.4 steals per game, earning second-team All-AAC honors. He was also named to the NABC All-District 24 first team. On April 5, he declared for the 2020 NBA draft while maintaining his college eligibility. On May 18, Hinton announced that he had hired an agent and would remain in the draft, forgoing his remaining two years of college eligibility.

Professional career

Dallas Mavericks (2020–2021)
After going undrafted in the 2020 NBA draft, Hinton signed a two-way contract with the Dallas Mavericks. On February 2, 2021, it was announced Hinton would have his first assignment at the NBA G League with the Long Island Nets. He then moved to the Santa Cruz Warriors. He was re-signed on August 3, 2021. On August 27, 2021, he was waived by the Mavericks.

Indiana Pacers/Fort Wayne Mad Ants (2021–2022)
On September 7, 2021, Hinton signed a Exhibit 10 deal with the Indiana Pacers. He subsequently joined their G League affiliate, the Fort Wayne Mad Ants. In 14 games, Hinton averaged 8.4 points and 5.5 rebounds per game. On December 30, he signed a 10-day contract with Indiana and on January 9, 2022, he was reacquired by Fort Wayne.

On April 7, 2022, the Pacers signed Hinton to a two-way contract.

Cleveland Charge (2022–present)
On October 24, 2022, Hinton joined the Cleveland Charge training camp roster.

Career statistics

NBA

Regular season

|-
| style="text-align:left;"| 
| style="text-align:left;"| Dallas
| 21 || 0 || 4.4 || .357 || .211 || .700 || .4 || .4 || .3 || .1 || 2.0
|-
| style="text-align:left;"| 
| style="text-align:left;"| Indiana
| 2 || 0 || 1.2 || .000 || − || − || .0 || .0 || .0 || .0 || .0
|- class="sortbottom"
| style="text-align:center;" colspan="2"| Career
| 23 || 0 || 4.2 || .349 || .211 || .700 || .4 || .3 || .3 || .1 || 2.0

College

|-
| style="text-align:left;"| 2018–19
| style="text-align:left;"| Houston
| 37 || 1 || 19.2 || .413 || .337 || .857 || 4.4 || 1.2 || 1.0 || .1 || 7.2
|-
| style="text-align:left;"| 2019–20
| style="text-align:left;"| Houston
| 31 || 31 || 30.3 || .410 || .387 || .756 || 8.7 || 2.0 || 1.4 || .2 || 10.6
|- class="sortbottom"
| style="text-align:center;" colspan="2"| Career
| 68 || 32 || 24.3 || .411 || .366 || .800 || 6.4 || 1.6 || 1.2 || .1 || 8.8

Personal life
Hinton's father, Dr. Benjamin Hinton, has been the pastor of Tabernacle Baptist Church in Gastonia since March 1991. Hinton had a religious upbringing.

References

External links

Houston Cougars bio

1999 births
Living people
American men's basketball players
Basketball players from North Carolina
Dallas Mavericks players
Fort Wayne Mad Ants players
Houston Cougars men's basketball players
Indiana Pacers players
Long Island Nets players
People from Gastonia, North Carolina
Santa Cruz Warriors players
Shooting guards
Small forwards
Undrafted National Basketball Association players
United States men's national basketball team players